The Southeast Alaska Discovery Center is a visitor center in Ketchikan, Alaska, operated by the United States Forest Service as part of the Tongass National Forest. The center provides interpretive exhibits and activities about the ecology, economy and culture of Southeast Alaska and its temperate rainforest ecosystems.

Design 
The building was designed by Jones & Jones Architects and Landscape Architects, led by the team of Grant Jones and noted indigenous architect Johnpaul Jones.

Exhibits 
The Discovery Center has four main exhibit halls, focusing respectively on the coastal rainforest ecosystem, Alaska Native cultures, other ecosystems of Southeast Alaska, and modern human uses of natural resources. Additionally, there is an exhibit honoring Elizabeth Peratrovich, a Tlingit civil rights leader, for whom the center's theater is named.

References

Gallery

External links
 

Buildings and structures in Ketchikan Gateway Borough, Alaska
Government buildings in Alaska
Ketchikan, Alaska
Natural history museums in Alaska
Tongass National Forest
Tourist attractions in Ketchikan Gateway Borough, Alaska
Visitor centers in the United States
United States Forest Service architecture
1995 establishments in Alaska